Medrese of Mehmet Şakir Paşa, also known as Madrasa of Mustafapaşa is a 19th-century madrasa,  an Islamic educational institute, in Nevşehir Province, central Turkey. It is also known as a caravanserai.

It was built in 1890 by Mehmet Şakir Pasha in the town center. The building was also used as an imaret, a public soup kitchen, and during the Republican era, it was used as carpet market. It was restored in 1982. Currently, it houses a part of Kapodokya Undergraduate School.

It is a U-plan building. There is a seven-line inscription on the main gate. The students' quarters are behind the arched portico.

References

History of Nevşehir Province
Buildings and structures in Nevşehir Province
Madrasas in Turkey
School buildings completed in 1890
Ürgüp
19th-century architecture in Turkey